Naregamia is a monotypic genus of flowering plants belonging to the family Meliaceae. The only species is Naregamia alata.

Its native range is Western India.

References

Meliaceae
Meliaceae genera
Monotypic Sapindales genera